Clifford Arthur Ollie (born September 19, 1941) is an American politician in the state of Iowa.

He was born in New York Mills, Minnesota. He attended Suomi College, Concordia College, as well as the University of Iowa and was a teacher. He served in the Iowa House of Representatives from 1983 to 1997, as a Democrat.

References

1941 births
Living people
Democratic Party members of the Iowa House of Representatives
University of Iowa alumni
People from New York Mills, Minnesota